Coda was a Canadian magazine covering jazz and related topics. The magazine produced 6 publications a year on a bi-monthly basis. Founded in 1958 by publisher and record producer John Norris, the magazine contained reviews and articles about jazz artists active internationally, as well as articles on jazz recordings, jazz books, and other topics related to jazz. In 1976, Norris was succeeded by saxophonist Bill Smith.

References

External links
Coda at The Canadian Encyclopedia

1958 establishments in Ontario
2009 disestablishments in Ontario
Bi-monthly magazines published in Canada
Defunct magazines published in Canada
Jazz magazines
Magazines established in 1958
Magazines disestablished in 2009
Magazines published in Toronto
Music magazines published in Canada